Thomas Lance Rentzel (born October 14, 1943) is a former American football flanker in the National Football League (NFL) for the Minnesota Vikings, Dallas Cowboys, and Los Angeles Rams. He played college football at the University of Oklahoma.

Early years
Rentzel was a four-sport star at Oklahoma City’s exclusive Casady School, playing football, basketball, baseball, and running track. He was an All-American high school halfback and the valedictorian of his graduating class.

Rentzel accepted a football scholarship from the University of Oklahoma under Bud Wilkinson. As a sophomore, he came off the injured list too late and had to hitchhike to Texas to play in the third game against the #2 ranked Longhorns. He had two long receptions in the game, one for a 34-yard touchdown.

As a junior, Rentzel posted 59 carries for 387 yards (second on the team) with a 6.6-yard average and two touchdowns. He was a versatile all-around halfback and was known for his open-field speed and propensity for big plays rushing, receiving passes, and returning kicks.

During his senior year in 1964, Rentzel was the team's top pass catcher (268 receiving yards) and punter (40.5-yard average). His 491 rushing yards ranked second on the team. In the Big Eight Conference, his 5.4 rushing average was second only to Gale Sayers. He also was the conference's No. 3 pass receiver, as well as No. 2 punter.

Rentzel was one of four Sooners players who missed the 1965 Gator Bowl game against Florida State University. Rentzel, offensive lineman Ralph Neely, Jim Grisham, and Wes Skidgel had signed with professional teams before the game and were ruled ineligible for the contest. Florida State won, 36–19, on the strength of four touchdown catches by Fred Biletnikoff.

Professional career

Minnesota Vikings
Rentzel was selected by the Minnesota Vikings in the second round (23rd overall) of the 1965 NFL draft. He was also selected in the sixth round (48th overall) of the 1965 AFL Draft by the Buffalo Bills. Rentzel played sparingly as a backup running back due to recurring injuries and his contributions came mainly as a kickoff returner during his first two seasons. Rentzel set the record for the longest kickoff return (101 yards) in franchise history as a rookie, which was broken by Aundrae Allison's 104-yarder in 2007 and Cordarrelle Patterson's 109-yarder in 2013.

In 1966, Rentzel only played in nine games due to ankle injuries. He averaged 20.1 yards on nine kickoff returns and caught two passes for 10 yards.

Dallas Cowboys

1967 season
On May 2, 1967, Rentzel was traded to the Dallas Cowboys in exchange for a third-round draft choice (#76-Mike McGill). The Cowboys converted Rentzel into a flanker, where he became not only an immediate starter over Pete Gent but also one of the best wideouts in the NFL. Rentzel led the team in receptions with 58 for 996 yards (two yards less than Bob Hayes). If Rentzel had gotten four more yards and Hayes two more, it would have been the first time in NFL history that a team had two 1,000-yard wide receivers. In the tenth game of the season, against the Washington Redskins, Rentzel had 13 receptions for 233 yards. The 13 receptions set the franchise record, and stood for 40 years (Jason Witten, 2007). The 233 yards were good enough for 3rd on the team at the time (now 6th). He also starred in the 1967 NFL Championship, known since as the "Ice Bowl", scoring a fourth-quarter, go-ahead touchdown later negated by the Packers' game-clinching drive.

1968 and 1969 seasons
In 1968, Rentzel led the Cowboys in receptions (54) and receiving yards (1,009) with an 18.7-yard average and five touchdowns. Also that year, Rentzel recorded a one-off single, "Lookin' Like Somethin' That Ain't" b/w "Beyond Love" on Columbia Records; the record managed to make the charts at WKY radio in Oklahoma City, but was not a national hit. In 1969, Rentzel led the Cowboys in receptions (43), receiving yards (960), and average receiving yards (22.3). Rentzel tied for the NFL lead in touchdowns scored (13) in 1969.

1970 season
In 1970, Rentzel was leading the team in receiving yards, when he was arrested for exposing himself to a 10-year-old girl. At the time the accusation was made, the press revealed a nearly forgotten incident that happened when, as a Minnesota Viking in September 1966, he was charged with exposing himself to two young girls in St. Paul, and pled guilty to the reduced charge of disorderly conduct. He was not sentenced to jail, but merely ordered to seek psychiatric care. Because of the nationwide reaction and publicity from the scandal, his wife, singer and actress Joey Heatherton, divorced him shortly thereafter. Rentzel asked the Cowboys to place him on the inactive list so he could devote his time to settling his personal affairs. He would miss the last three games of the regular season, including the Cowboys' playoff drive to its narrow Super Bowl V loss to the Baltimore Colts. Rentzel finished with 28 receptions (second on the team) for 556 yards (second on the team) with a 19.9-yard average and five touchdowns.

1971 season
On May 19, 1971, Rentzel was traded to the Los Angeles Rams in exchange for tight end Billy Truax and wide receiver Wendell Tucker. Head coach Tom Landry said after the trade, "We know we are giving up on one of the top flankers in the league, but I thought he would be better off in another city where he had the same opportunity regularly. We found this in Los Angeles, and it was one of the teams Lance wanted to be traded to if he were traded." To replace him, the Cowboys also obtained Lance Alworth from the San Diego Chargers, in exchange for the left tackle Tony Liscio, the tight end Pettis Norman, and the defensive tackle Ron East.

Although he spent only four seasons with the Cowboys, Rentzel left as the team's fourth all-time wide receiver in addition to other franchise records:

 Most receptions in a game (13 in 1967), which was broken by Jason Witten twice (15 in 2007 and 18 in 2012).
 Most consecutive 100-yard receiving games (three), until Michael Irvin passed him in 1995 with four.
 Still fourth for most receiving touchdowns in a season (12).
 Still fourth for most career postseason receiving yards (242).
 Still fourth for most receiving yards in a game (233).

Los Angeles Rams
Rentzel led the Los Angeles Rams in receptions (38) in 1971, but was never able to regain his previous level of play. In October 1972, he was the subject of a lengthy feature article in SPORT Magazine written by Gary Cartwright. Also that year, Rentzel wrote When All the Laughter Died in Sorrow, about his professional football experiences and personal life.

In 1973, while on probation for the indecent exposure charge, Rentzel was suspended indefinitely by the NFL at the start of the 1973 season for conduct detrimental to the league after being convicted for possession of marijuana. He was reinstated in 1974 after a ten-month suspension.

Rentzel was one of three men credited with inspiring the eccentricities that surround Media Day at the Super Bowl. In January 1975, SPORT Magazine editor Dick Schaap hired Rentzel and teammate Fred Dryer to cover Super Bowl IX. Donning costumes inspired by The Front Page, "Cubby O'Switzer" (Rentzel) and "Scoops Brannigan" (Dryer) peppered players and coaches from both the Minnesota Vikings and Pittsburgh Steelers with questions that ranged from the clichéd to the downright absurd. Rentzel humorously explained, "We're here to ask the dumbest questions we can and to mooch as much food and beer as we possibly can."

Retirement
On August 27, 1975, Rentzel was placed on waivers, effectively ending his career. After playing in nine NFL seasons, Rentzel accumulated 4,826 receiving yards, 38 receiving touchdowns, 196 rushing yards, three rushing touchdowns, 1,000 return yards, a touchdown from a fumble recovery, and a perfect passer rating of 158.3 by completing his lone pass attempt for a 58-yard touchdown.

Personal life
In April 1969, Rentzel married Joey Heatherton, an actress, dancer, and singer, in New York City. After his indecent exposure charge (see above), Heatherton filed for divorce on September 18, 1971, and it became final in 1972.

References

1943 births
Living people
Sportspeople from Oklahoma City
Players of American football from Oklahoma
American football wide receivers
Oklahoma Sooners football players
Minnesota Vikings players
Dallas Cowboys players
Los Angeles Rams players
American memoirists